Nephalioides is a genus of beetles in the family Cerambycidae, containing the following species:

 Nephalioides nigriventris (Bates, 1874)
 Nephalioides rutilus (Bates, 1872)

References

Elaphidiini